Filipa César (born 1975 in Portugal) is an artist and filmmaker. She lives and works in Berlin, and studied at the Faculty of Arts in Porto and Lisbon (1996–99), the Academy of Arts in Munich (1999–2000) and MA Art in Context, University of Arts, Berlin (2007). Since April 2021 César is professor at Merz Akademie Stuttgart, Germany.

Filipa César has exhibited, among other places, at 8. Istanbul Biennial, 2003; Kunsthalle Wien, 2004; Serralves Museum, 2005; Locarno International Film Festival, 2005; CAG- Contemporary Art Gallery, Vancouver, 2006; Tate Modern, 2007; St. Gallen Museum, 2007; International Triennale of Contemporary Art, Prague, 2008; SF MOMA, San Francisco 2009, 12th Architecture Biennial, Venice, 29th São Paulo Biennial 2010, São Paulo and Manifesta 8, Cartagena.

Filmography 

 Conakry (2013)
 Mined Soil (2014)
 Transmission from the Liberated Zones (2015), Berlinale 2016
 Spell Reel (2017)
 Sunstone (2017)
 Skola di Tarafe (2022)

Installations
 F for Fake (2005) 
 Rapport (2007)
 Le Passeur (2008)
 The Four Chambered Heart (2009)
 Memograma (2010)
Calouste Gulbenkian Foundation (2019)
Project Quantum Creole (2019)

References

External links
Commons: Filipa César
Kunstaspekte
Cristina Guerra Contemporary Gallery, Lisbon
Artfacts
Fundação Bienal de São Paulo
Manifesta 8

Portuguese film directors
Portuguese women film directors
Living people
1975 births
Film directors from Berlin
Artists from Porto
Berlin University of the Arts alumni